Rainier II may refer to:

 Rainier II of Hainaut (890–932) 
 Rainier II, Lord of Monaco (1350–1407)